Alexandre Ginnsz is a French film director, writer, and producer who moved to the United States in 1987.

Duo
In 1995, Ginnsz made Duo, his first film. Duo won both the Martin Scorsese and the Warner Bros. Pictures Film Awards. It was also an official entry at the 1996 Student Academy Awards, Finalist at the 1996 Chicago International Children's Film Festival, Winner of the 1996 Wasserman Award for best cinematography and nominated for a TASH Media Award.

Stephane Ginnsz, Alexandre's 12-year-old brother and star of Duo, became the first lead actor with Down syndrome in history.

References
Stephane Ginnsz' official site

Living people
French film directors
Year of birth missing (living people)